Adilson Aguero dos Santos (born 22 August 1990 in Maringá), commonly known as Adilson Maringá, is a Brazilian professional footballer who plays as a goalkeeper for Indonesian club Arema.

Club career

Arema
He was signed for Arema to play in Liga 1 in the 2021 season. He made his league debut on 5 September 2021 in a match against PSM Makassar at the Pakansari Stadium, Cibinong.

Career statistics

Honours

Club 
Beira-Mar
 AF Aveiro Supercup: 2019

Arema
 Indonesia President's Cup: 2022

Individual 
 Indonesia President's Cup Best Player: 2022

References

External links

1990 births
Living people
Brazilian footballers
Association football goalkeepers
Sociedade Esportiva do Gama players
People from Maringá
Sportspeople from Paraná (state)
Campeonato Brasileiro Série C players
Campeonato de Portugal (league) players
 Liga Portugal 2 players
Liga 1 (Indonesia) players
Mogi Mirim Esporte Clube players
C.D. Pinhalnovense
C.D. Aves players
S.C. Beira-Mar players
U.D. Vilafranquense players
Arema F.C. players
Expatriate footballers in Portugal
Brazilian expatriate sportspeople in Portugal
Expatriate footballers in Indonesia
Brazilian expatriate sportspeople in Indonesia
Brazilian expatriate footballers